World No. 1 Victoria Azarenka successfully defended her title, beating world no. 2 Serena Williams in the final, 7–6(8–6), 2–6, 6–3.

All of the top three seeds (Azarenka, Williams and Maria Sharapova) were in contention for the World No. 1 ranking at the start of the tournament. Williams regained the World No. 1 ranking for the first time since October 2010, becoming the oldest No. 1 player in the history of the WTA after she beat Petra Kvitová in the quarterfinals. She would remain the world No. 1 for a further 186 weeks until 12 September 2016, when she was replaced by Angelique Kerber, tying Steffi Graf's record for longest consecutive spell at No. 1.

Seeds
The top eight seeds receive a bye into the second round.

Draw

Finals

Top half

Section 1

Section 2

Bottom half

Section 3

Section 4

Qualifying

Seeds

Qualifiers

Lucky losers

Draw

First qualifier

Second qualifier

Third qualifier

Fourth qualifier

Fifth qualifier

Sixth qualifier

Seventh qualifier

Eighth qualifier

References

External links
 Main draw
 Qualifying draw

2013 WTA Tour
2013 Qatar Total Open - 1